Medicorophium affine is a species of amphipod crustacean. It is a small (up to 5 mm) species which burrows in bottom sediments, between 10 and 80 metres deep. It occurs on coasts of Northern Europe.

References

Corophiidea
Crustaceans of the Atlantic Ocean
Crustaceans described in 1859